Third Eye  is the third album by bassist Ben Allison. It was released on the Palmetto Records label in 1999.

Track listing
All compositions by Ben Allison, except where noted.

 Four Folk Songs
 Love Is Proximity (Herbie Nichols)
 Kush
 Random Sex and Violins
 Mantra
 A Life in the Day of Man Ray
 Andrew
 Hot Head
 Pot Head

Personnel
 Ben Allison – Bass, Guitar
 Michael Blake – Saxophones
 Ted Nash – Saxophones
 Tomas Ulrich – Cello
 Frank Kimbrough – Piano
 Ron Horton – Trumpet
 Jeff Ballard – Drums
 Ara Dinkjian – Oud, Cumbus

References

External links
 benallison.com - Third Eye

1999 albums
Ben Allison albums
Palmetto Records albums